Sri Medananda Daham Pasala() is a school located in the Akuressa Matara Road Near the Palatuwa Village. It was initially founded as a Daham school in 1974. The founder of the school was the Rer. Baragama Dammaloka Thero incumbent of Unella Sri Nagarama Purana Viharaya. The school has a population  of 310 students studying from primary level to secondary level and 18 teachers.

Principals

Daham Pasal Houses
College Houses' Names and Colours:

External links

 Facebook Fan page
 See also Sri Siduhath Daham School

Schools in Matara District